Heemsen is a Samtgemeinde ("collective municipality") in the district of Nienburg, in Lower Saxony, Germany. Its seat is in the village Rohrsen.

The Samtgemeinde Heemsen consists of the following municipalities:
 Drakenburg
 Haßbergen 
 Heemsen
 Rohrsen

Samtgemeinden in Lower Saxony